Megiddo: The Omega Code 2 is a 2001 religious science fiction-adventure film, directed by Brian Trenchard-Smith and starring Michael York, Michael Biehn, Diane Venora, R. Lee Ermey, Udo Kier and Franco Nero. It is a follow-up to the 1999 film The Omega Code, serving as part prequel and part alternate retelling of the first film. It has a significantly larger budget ($20 million) than its predecessor ($7.6 million). Lead actor York detailed the making of the film in a journal which he then published in book form, titled Dispatches from Armageddon.

Plot
Stone Alexander is a six-year-old boy whose mother has died giving birth to his younger brother, David. During a party at his influential father's home, Stone is left alone with David, who is in his crib. As Stone stares into the fireplace, a fiery force engulfs the boy, possessing him. Stone attempts to burn his baby brother, but David is saved by their nanny. Their father, Daniel (David Hedison), sends Stone away to a military academy in Italy for his education, under the guidance of General Francini (Franco Nero).

Not long after arriving at the academy, he is drawn to a church where he meets his demonic Guardian (Udo Kier) (who later becomes Stone's false prophet), and participates in a black mass ceremony. Years pass, and although Stone is periodically abused by some of his classmates, he eventually earns their respect, becoming the top student in his class. After graduating, Stone meets his younger brother David (Chad Michael Murray), who is now a teenager. Soon after graduation, Stone marries his Italian girlfriend, Gabriella, the daughter of General Francini. The General was initially against their marriage, but Stone summons two smoke-like demons to intimidate the General into giving in.

Eventually, Stone becomes President of the European Union He uses his seat of power to dissolve the United Nations and create a world government called the World Union. To consolidate his power, Stone pressures the President of the United States Richard Benson (R. Lee Ermey) to join his global community. Stone summons Benson to meet with him in Rome. Prior to departing for Italy, President Benson orders the U.S. Navy's Sixth Fleet to take up position off of the coast of Italy in the event of an emergency.

Accompanying the president on his flight to Italy is David Alexander (Michael Biehn), who is now the Vice President of the United States, and the president's military aide, U.S. Marine Colonel Rick Howard (Gil Colon). During an informal meeting on Air Force One, David and Col. Howard warn the president to keep his distance from Stone, due to a CIA report, which indicates that over 200 people who had opposed Stone in the past had died under questionable circumstances after close contact. Unfortunately, Benson fails to grasp just how ruthless Stone really is; Stone kills him with a supernaturally induced heart attack. David is sworn in as the new President at the hour of President Benson's death.

Much to Stone's disappointment, his brother also refuses to join his New World Order. Secretary of State Breckenridge (Jim Metzler) however, wants the United States to join the global community aligned with Stone. After failing to convince David to fall in line with the World Union, he publicizes a doctored video of David murdering his father. In reality, it was Stone who killed him.

Breckenridge orders the FBI to arrest the president. After a heated exchange of gunfire between the Secret Service detail and the FBI agents, the president escapes by helicopter to Norfolk Naval Base, where the U.S. Navy brass provides him with transport to the Sixth Fleet on an amphibious assault ship. After arriving, David orders a special forces raid on Stone's castle headquarters in Rome; however, he discovers that Stone is already in Israel. David finds Gabriella (Diane Venora) in the dungeon, confined there by the Guardian after she witnessed some of Stone's demonic powers. She dies in David's arms after professing her love. Following the raid, Colonel Howard receives word that Breckenridge is sending U.S. troops to Israel to join Stone's military coalition, which are on the plains of Megiddo planning a strike on Jerusalem.

Following the raid in Rome, David and Colonel Howard move quietly to join U.S. forces already in Israel. Unknown to Stone, the Mexicans, Chinese, and Americans are really there to destroy Stone and his army. David attempts to kill Stone himself but is soon captured.

Later, Chinese tanks open fire upon his European troops from one side while U.S. and Mexican forces attack from the other. Shortly afterwards, Stone's troops are hit by air strikes as well. Taken completely by surprise, and with his forces being quickly overrun, Stone instructs all his soldiers to fight to the death. After overrunning Stone's armored and artillery positions, the Mexican tanks charge headlong, targeting the enemy headquarters.

Stone and his officers are swallowed in a huge fireball as tank shells rain in. David barely manages to break free and jump away before the headquarters explodes behind him.  David is stunned as Stone walks out of the ashes unharmed. He then morphs into a massive creature with some ram's horns and huge leather wings. David realizes in horror that the creature is the incarnation of the devil himself. After fatally wounding David, Stone/Satan summons up his dark brethren as reinforcements and revives his dead army. In a full display of his supernatural powers, he even darkens the sun, plunging the whole battlefield into darkness.

The reinforcements soon outnumber and overrun the Mexican, Chinese, and American forces. In triumph, Stone/Satan, celebrates as he cries out loudly that he is Lord. At this boast, a bright white light lances down into the ruins of the headquarters and begins dropping meteors of light upon the battlefield. All of Stone's soldiers are killed, while all of the allied survivors remain untouched, and are freed from their bonds. Stone's former Guardian is dismayed at Stone/Satan's defeat and tries to run from the battlefield. A globe of light chases him and quickly impales him with swords of pure light, causing him to be vaporized. Stone/Satan himself is driven to his knees and forced to admit that Jesus Christ is the one true Lord. The light then pulverizes the ground beneath him, dropping Stone/Satan (who is trying in vain to hang onto a ledge and is calling out for David to come and save him right before he loses his grip while shouting Nazarene) into a deep pit of molten lava, the Lake of fire. There he finds out that he is chained, and screams in anguish, defeated. As David lies on the ground looking up into the sky smiling, the light becomes brighter, and then fades away, revealing a scene of an Earthly paradise. A scripture is revealed on screen that God has established his home with man, and that He shall reign forever, and ever.

Cast
 Michael York as Stone Alexander/Satan (voice)
 Michael Biehn as Vice President/President David Alexander
 Diane Venora as Gabriella Francini Alexander
 R. Lee Ermey as President Richard Benson
 Udo Kier as The Guardian
 Franco Nero as General Francini
 Jim Metzler as Secretary of State/President Breckenridge
 David Hedison as Daniel Alexander
 Eduardo Yáñez as General García of the Mexican Army
 Michael Paul Chan as Chinese Premier
 Oleg Stefan as Russian President Kachitsky
 Noah Huntley as Stone Alexander (age 21)
 Chad Michael Murray as David Alexander (age 16)

Production and distribution
Trenchard Smith later said
Ever since seeing Sydney Pollack’s great ironic World War two movie Castle Keep (1969), I have wanted to stage modern war at an ancient castle. Megiddo (2001) provided the perfect opportunity at Castle Ordeski in Brac-chiano, where indenta-tions of cannonballs from a sixteenth-century siege are still visible on the walls. We however, didn’t leave a scratch as twelve Apache helicopters strafed the battlements, while US Army Rangers rappelled down and fought their way in. this is because our choppers are digital, intercut with stuntmen rappelling from off-screen scaffolding. this kind of sequence would have been prohibitive, even with my $18 million budget, until the computer graphic era. In the battle scenes we can digitally multiply tents and tanks on the ground and add Harriers and helicopter gunships to the skies.
Megiddo: The Omega Code 2 has been aired frequently by the Trinity Broadcasting Network (TBN), both over the internet and on television, since its initial release in 2002.

The film was produced by Code Productions in conjunction with TBN's Gener8Xion Entertainment, Infinity Omnimedia, and TBN Films.

Reception
Megiddo: The Omega Code 2 was panned by critics. On Rotten Tomatoes it has an approval rating of 10% based on reviews from 20 critics.

Accolades
Cinematographer Bert Dunk was nominated for Best Cinematography in Theatrical Feature at the Canadian Society of Cinematographers Awards.

See also
 Armageddon

Notes

References

External links
 
 
 

2000s thriller films
2000s science fiction adventure films
2000s mystery films
2001 independent films
2001 films
American thriller films
American mystery films
Apocalyptic films
Films about Christianity
Films about brothers
Films about religion
Films set in Israel
Films set in Italy
Films set in Rome
Films shot in Madrid
Films shot in Rome
American independent films
Films directed by Brian Trenchard-Smith
2000s English-language films
2000s American films